Louise Field (born 25 February 1967) is a retired professional tennis player from Australia. She competed in the Australian Open from 1984 to 1994.

WTA Tour finals

Singles (0–1)

Doubles (2–1)

Career finals

Singles (4–3)

Doubles (6–7)

References 

1967 births
Living people
Australian female tennis players
Grand Slam (tennis) champions in girls' doubles
Place of birth missing (living people)
Australian Open (tennis) junior champions
Wimbledon junior champions